Yochum is a surname, an Americanized version of the German Joachim. It may refer to the following people:
Dan Yochum (1950–2020), American player of Canadian football
Harold L. Yochum (1903–1974), American theologian and church leader

References